Beljina  is a suburban settlement of Belgrade, Serbia. It is located in the municipality of Barajevo. Beljina is a small rural settlement with 775 inhabitants as of 2011, located on the northeastern tip of the Kosmaj mountain, 12 km south of the municipal seat of Barajevo. In 1956 the municipality of Beljina was created, comprising villages of Beljina, Arnajevo, Manić and Rožanci, but already in 1957 the municipality was dissolved and annexed to the municipality of Barajevo.

Demographics

In 2011, the settlement contained 270 households with an average of 2.87 members. There were 228 families, with 87% of the population being adults and an average age of 46.2.

Wildlife

By the 21st century, number of migratory European rollers in Serbia was reduced to some 20 nesting couples, where only few were recorded in Central Serbia and none in the central Šumadija region. The species was widespread by the mid-20th century, but was protected by the state in 1993. In order to try to repopulate the species, ornithologists placed bird houses on top of the trees in Beljina in 2015, but the attempt was unsuccessful. In 2017 the bird houses was moved to the village's utility poles, and rollers began nesting again, starting in 2018, in slowly growing numbers each year.

References

Suburbs of Belgrade
Former and proposed municipalities of Belgrade
Barajevo